Proverbs 29 is the 29th chapter of the Book of Proverbs in the Hebrew Bible or the Old Testament of the Christian Bible. The book is a compilation of several wisdom literature collections, with the heading in 1:1 may be intended to regard Solomon as the traditional author of the whole book, but the dates of the individual collections are difficult to determine, and the book probably obtained its final shape in the post-exilic period. This chapter is the last part of the fifth collection of the book, so-called "the Second Solomonic Collection."

Text
The original text is written in Hebrew language. This chapter is divided into 27 verses.

Textual witnesses
Some early manuscripts containing the text of this chapter in Hebrew are of the Masoretic Text, which includes the Aleppo Codex (10th century), and Codex Leningradensis (1008). 

There is also a translation into Koine Greek known as the Septuagint, made in the last few centuries BC; some extant ancient manuscripts of this version include Codex Vaticanus (B; B; 4th century), Codex Sinaiticus (S; BHK: S; 4th century), and Codex Alexandrinus (A; A; 5th century).

Analysis
This chapter belongs to a further collection of Solomonic proverbs, transmitted and
edited by royal scribes during the reign of Hezekiah, comprising Proverbs  25–29. Based on differences in style and subject-matter there could be two originally separate collections: 
 Proverbs 25–27: characterized by many similes and the 'earthy' tone
 Proverbs 28–29: characterized by many antithetical sayings and the predominantly 'moral and religious' tone (cf. Proverbs 10–15)

Verse 1
He who is often reproved, yet hardens his neck,will suddenly be destroyed, and that without remedy."He who is often reproved": from a Hebrew construction  ʾish tokhakhot, "a man of rebukes", meaning "a man who has (or receives) many rebukes" to describe a person 'who is deserving of punishment and who has been given many warnings'.
"Hardens his neck": or "stiffens his neck" (ESV) from a Hebrew idiom  maqsheh-ʿoref, "to harden the neck", with the idea of 'resisting the rebukes and persisting in obstinacy' (cf. Exodus 32:9), as the opposite of "bending back" or 'submission'.

Verse 2When the righteous increase, the people rejoice,but when the wicked rule, the people groan."When the wicked rule": this cause the groaning of the people 'under an intolerable burden as injustice and violence would flourish unchecked' (verse 2, 16), but righteousness will prevail in the end (cf. Proverbs 11:10–11; 28:12, 28).

Verse 14

Methodist commentator Joseph Benson makes the point that a king who judges the poor "faithfully" (the word used in the King James Version) also judges the rich "faithfully", but he argues that the proverb "names the poor, because these are much oppressed and injured by others, and least regarded by princes, and yet committed to their more especial care".

Verse 27

This final verse of chapter 29 has additional words in the Latin Vulgate, Verbum custodiens filius extra perditionem erit'', which appear in some versions of the Septuagint after Proverbs 24:22, and are translated in the Douay-Rheims 1899 American Edition as "The son that keepeth the word, shall be free from destruction".

See also

Related Bible parts: Proverbs 10, Proverbs 15, Proverbs 25

References

Sources

External links
 Jewish translations:
 Mishlei - Proverbs - Chapter 29 (Judaica Press) translation [with Rashi's commentary] at Chabad.org
 Christian translations:
 Online Bible at GospelHall.org (ESV, KJV, Darby, American Standard Version, Bible in Basic English)
 Book of Proverbs Chapter 29 King James Version
  Various versions

29